The bight stinkfish, Foetorepus phasis, is a dragonet of the family Callionymidae, found in the eastern Indian and southwest Pacific Oceans, at depths of between 160 and 200 m. Length is up to 13 cm.

References
 
 

Callionymidae
Fish described in 1880
Taxa named by Albert Günther